RISP may stand for:

Rhode Island State Police
Runner In Scoring Position, a baseball statistic indicating batting average with runners in scoring position
Recurrent Isolated Sleep Paralysis, a chronic form of sleep paralysis
Rare Isotope Science Project, the research center overseeing the Rare isotope Accelerator complex for ON-line experiment particle accelerator